Pricedale is an unincorporated community located in Pike County, Mississippi, United States.

References

Unincorporated communities in Pike County, Mississippi
Unincorporated communities in Mississippi
McComb micropolitan area